Kuder is a surname. Notable people with the surname include:

Andrew Kuder (1838–1899), American soldier
Aaron Kuder, American comic book artist and writer
G. Frederic Kuder (1903–2000), American counseling psychologist and psychometrician
Jeremiah Kuder (1835–1916), American soldier

See also
Kuder–Richardson Formula 20